Mohd. Othman bin Yusof is a Malaysian politician from UMNO, businessman and a former television producer. He was the Member of Johor State Legislative Assembly for Kukup from 2008 to 2013 and from 2018 to 2022.

Early career 
He was a producer of Malaysia's first animated TV series, Usop Sontorian, produced by Kharisma Pictures as well as the Director of MOY Publications Sdn Bhd, which publishes the comics, Ujang and Apo?. He was also the executive director of Country Garden Pacificview Sdn Bhd before being a state assemblyman.

Political career 
He is the Chief of UMNO Tanjung Piai branch.

Election results

Awards and recognitions 

  :
  Officer of the Order of the Defender of the Realm (KMN) (2009)
  :
 Member of the Exalted Order of Malacca (DSM)
 Grand Commander of the Exalted Order of Malacca (DMSM) – Datuk (2002)

References 

United Malays National Organisation politicians
Malaysian people of Malay descent
Living people
Year of birth missing (living people)
Officers of the Order of the Defender of the Realm